Tarrawingee is a locality and a ghost town in the Far West region of New South Wales, some  north of the town of Broken Hill. The town was established in 1889 to exploit a deposit of limestone needed as flux for the smelters at Broken Hill. The township grew to accommodate 400 people and facilities included a post office, two pubs, a police station, a court house and a school. In 1898, smelting moved to Port Pirie and the limestone quarry closed. Today only the stone foundations of a few buildings remain.

Between 1890 and 1930, Tarrawingee was the terminus of the Tarrawingee Tramway. Used at first to cart limestone back to Broken Hill, it was later used as a stepping off point for coaches heading to places such as  Tibooburra and Milparinka. The line closed permanently in 1932 and the lines were removed in 1936.

The town had a Hotel, Police Station and a school. A tram line was constructed to the town  operated from 1890 to 1936.
Tarrawingee is located on Campbells Creek near is headwaters.

See also 
Tarrawingee, Victoria

References

External links
Tarrawingee township - Corner Country

Localities in New South Wales
Ghost towns in New South Wales

Mining towns in New South Wales